Kazoo is a print magazine for children, based in Brooklyn, New York. It was the first children's magazine to be awarded the General Excellence, Special Interest award by the National Magazine Awards in 2019.

Founding 

Kazoo magazine is independently owned by its editor-in-chief Erin Bried. Prior to founding Kazoo, Bried worked for 18 years as a writer and editor for Conde Nast women’s magazines including Glamour and Self. In 2022 Bried was added to the distinguished alumni Wall of Honor for founding Kazoo by the Parkland School District Education Foundation.

In 2016, Kazoo magazine launched via crowdfunding. 3,136 backers contributed $171,215 to fund the magazine. The first issue was published in July 2016, and included contributions by Alison Bechdel, Diana Nyad, Mickalene Thomas, Jacqueline Woodson, Lucy Knisley, Doreen Cronin, and Meenakshi Wadhwa.

Description 
Kazoo is a quarterly magazine, published 4 times a year. Each issue is 64 pages long and includes puzzles, stories, comics, games, interviews, and crafts. The magazine is aimed at girls aged 5–12 and has attracted contributors such as Ruth Bader Ginsburg, Jane Goodall and Ellen DeGeneres.

The magazine's editorial stance has been described as "feminist". Its tagline is "for girls who aren't afraid to make some noise."

Awards 
 2018-2020 - named a Parents' Choice Gold Award.
 2019 - won the National Magazine Award for General Excellence, Special Interest.
 2022 (twice), 2021, 2017 - a finalist for a National Magazine Award.
 2020 - published a collection of comics with Knopf entitled Noisemakers: 25 Women Who Raised Their Voices & Changed the World which won a Pop Culture Classroom award for Excellence in Graphic Literature.
 2022 - named a Merit Winner by The Society of Publication Designers.

Regular Features 
Every issue of Kazoo is arranged around a theme and divided into the following categories: Tickle (puzzles and games), Explore (math & sciences), Grow (nature & biology), Tinker (engineering), Read (original fiction), Feast (recipe), Comic (historical comic), Share (contributions from Kazoo readers), and Believe (inspirational poster). Some issues may also include the sections Create (art), Feel (emotions), Play (sports), Rally (community activism), and Question (critical thinking).

Fiction 
Every issue of Kazoo contains an original story by an award-winning and/or bestselling female author, that features a girl protagonist. Past contributors include:

Kazoo 1: Doreen Cronin
Kazoo 2: Polly Horvath
Kazoo 3: Kathi Appelt
Kazoo 4: Lauren Wolk
Kazoo 5: Emma Straub
Kazoo 6: Jane Yolen
Kazoo 7: Meg Wolitzer
Kazoo 8: Joyce Carol Oates
Kazoo 9: Kathi Appelt
Kazoo 10: Angela Flournoy
Kazoo 11: Bumni Laditan
Kazoo 12: Karina Yan Glaser
Kazoo 13: Elisabeth Egan
Kazoo 14: Kristen Arnett
Kazoo 15: Kimberly Brubaker Bradley
Kazoo 16: Erin Entrada Kelly
Kazoo 17: Meg Medina
Kazoo 18: Carmen Maria Machado
Kazoo 19: Laura Lippman
Kazoo 20: Veera Hiranandani
Kazoo 21: Renée Watson
Kazoo 22: Kira Jane Buxton
Kazoo 23: A.S. King
Kazoo 24: Erin Entrada Kelly
Kazoo 25: Lauren Wolk

Comics 
Every issue of Kazoo contains an original 6-page historical comic by an award-winning and/or bestselling artist that features a notable woman in history. Past contributors include:

Kazoo 1: Lucy Knisley on Betty Robinson
Kazoo 2: Rosemary Valero-O'Connell on Hallie Daggett
Kazoo 3: Jen Wang on Emily Warren Roebling
Kazoo 4: Shannon Wright on Bessie Coleman
Kazoo 5: Alitha E. Martinez on Josephine Baker
Kazoo 6: Yao Xiao on Raye Montague
Kazoo 7: Rebecca Mock on Ida Lewis
Kazoo 8: Lucy Knisley on Julia Child
Kazoo 9: Brittney Williams on Wangari Maathai
Kazoo 10: Ashley A. Woods on Rosa Parks
Kazoo 11: Emily Flake on Eleanor Roosevelt
Kazoo 12: Lucy Bellwood on Jeanne Baret
Kazoo 13: Kerstin A. La Cross on Rachel Carson
Kazoo 14: Steenz on Marian Anderson
Kazoo 15: Alitha E. Martinez on Mary Fields
Kazoo 16: Rosemary Valero-O’Connell on Flourence Nightengale
Kazoo 17: Kate Leth on Grace Hopper
Kazoo 18: Micheline Hess on Toni Morrison
Kazoo 19: Molly Brooks on Kate Warne
Kazoo 20: Kat Leyh on Grace Hopper
Kazoo 21: Maris Wicks on Katherine Switzer
Kazoo 22: Ellen Crenshaw on Dian Fossey
Kazoo 23: Marinaomi on Yayoi Kusama
Kazoo 24: Sophie Escabasse on Adelaide Herman
Kazoo 25: Maris Wicks on Eugine Clark

Recipes 
Every issue of Kazoo contains a recipe by a female chef or restauranteur, with a feature interview. Past contributors include:

Kazoo 1: chef Fany Gerson
Kazoo 2: chef Melba Wilson of Melba's
Kazoo 3: chef Joanne Chang
Kazoo 4: chef Amanda Cohen
Kazoo 5: chef Jessica Koslow of Squirl
Kazoo 6: chef Suchanan Aksornnan of Baoburg
Kazoo 7: chef Sarah Sanneh of Pies ‘n Thighs 
Kazoo 8: baker and author Dorrie Greenspan
Kazoo 9: chef and restauranteur Alice Waters
Kazoo 10: chef Leah Chase
Kazoo 11: chef Libby Willis of Meme’s Diner
Kazoo 12: ice cream maker Diana Hardeman
Kazoo 13: Mollie Katzen, author of the Moosewood Cookbook
Kazoo 14: Four and Twenty Blackbirds owners Melissa Elsen and Emily Elsen
Kazoo 15: Cowgirl restaurant owner Sherry Delamarter
Kazoo 16: Just Bakery’s Bhima Thapa-Magar
Kazoo 17: Jenni's Splendid Ice Cream maker Jeni Britton Bauer 
Kazoo 18: chef Rawia Bishara, owner of Tanoreen restaurant 
Kazoo 19: Baker Alicia Wong
Kazoo 20: Pasta Louise restaurant chef Allison Arevalo
Kazoo 21: Chef and author Zoë François
Kazoo 22: Magnolia Bakery baker Bobbie Lloyd
Kazoo 23: Bread baker and artist Teri Culletto
Kazoo 24:  Levain Bakery co-owners Pamela Weekes and Connie McDonald
Kazoo 25: Cabot's Candy owner Jen Karoni

Art 
Kazoo contains a Create section that features work, an interview, and advice from contemporary female artists. Past contributors include:

Kazoo 1: artist Mickalene Thomas
Kazoo 2: photographer Catherine Opie, artist Emil Ferris 
Kazoo 3: artist Amy Sillman
Kazoo 4: artist Vexta
Kazoo 5: artist Beatriz Milhazes
Kazoo 6: artist Bisa Butler
Kazoo 7: artist Judith Schaechter 
Kazoo 8: artist Saya Woolfalk
Kazoo 9: weaver Barbara Teller Ornelas
Kazoo 10: art activists The Guerrilla Girls, cartoonist Liza Donnelly
Kazoo 11: artist Ashley Longshore
Kazoo 12: art historian Leslie King-Hammond
Kazoo 13: artist Ann Carrington
Kazoo 14: artist Camille Wallala
Kazoo 15: designer Kathie Sever, sculptor Kristen Visbol
Kazoo 16: fiber artist Shoplifter
Kazoo 17: artist Deborah Kass 
Kazoo 18: artist Faith Reingold 
Kazoo 21: artist Maya Hayuk
Kazoo 22:  botanical artist Alice Tangerini
Kazoo 23: artists Amy Sherald, Julie Mehretu, Nina Chanel Abney and Xylor Jane
Kazoo 24: artist Janet Echelman
Kazoo 25: artist Lisa Congdon

External links 
 Kazoo magazine official website
 Noisemakers: 25 Women Who Raised Their Voices and Changed the World

References 

Advertising-free magazines
Children's magazines published in the United States
Magazines established in 2016
Magazines published in New York City
Quarterly magazines published in the United States
English-language magazines
Youth magazines